Rumelihisarı (also known as Rumelian Castle and Roumeli Hissar Castle) or Boğazkesen Castle (meaning "Strait-Blocker Castle" or literally "Throat-Cutter Castle") is a medieval fortress located in Istanbul, Turkey, on a series of hills on the European banks of the Bosphorus. The fortress also lends its name to the immediate neighborhood around it in the city's Sarıyer district.

Conceived and built between 1451 and 1452 on the orders of Ottoman Sultan Mehmed II, the complex was commissioned in preparation for a planned Ottoman siege on the then-Byzantine city of Constantinople, with the goal of cutting off maritime military and logistical relief that could potentially come to the Byzantines' aid by way of the Bosphorus Strait, hence the fortress's alternative name, "Boğazkesen", i.e. "Strait-cutter" Castle. Its older sister structure, Anadoluhisari ("Anatolian Fortress"), sits on the opposite banks of the Bosporus, and the two fortresses worked in tandem during the final siege to throttle all naval traffic along the Bosphorus, thus helping the Ottomans achieve their goal of making the city of Constantinople (later renamed Istanbul) their new imperial capital in 1453.

After the Ottoman conquest of the city, Rumelihisarı served as a customs checkpoint and occasional prison, notably for the embassies of states that were at war with the Empire. After suffering extensive damage in the Great Earthquake of 1509, the structure was repaired, and was used continuously until the late 19th century.

Today, the fortress is a popular museum open to the public, and further acts as an open-air venue for seasonal concerts, art festivals, and special events.

History

Construction

The necessity of a strategic fortress on the Bosphorus was well known to the Ottomans, who had started in the late 14th century to harbor intentions of capturing the city of Constantinople as a new capital for their then-nascent Empire. In a previous Ottoman attempt to conquer the city, Sultan Murad II (1421–44, 1446–51) had encountered difficulties due to a blockade of the Bosphorus by the Byzantine fleet. Having learned the importance of maritime strategy from this earlier attempt, Sultan Mehmed II (1444–46, 1451–81), son of Murad II, started planning a new offensive immediately following his ascent to the throne in 1451.

In response to the coronation of the ambitious young Sultan, Byzantine Emperor Constantine XI (1449–53), who understood Mehmed's intentions on Constantinople and was wary of the threat posed by the growing Ottoman influence in the region, hoped to secure a diplomatic solution that would protect the city, while averting the Byzantines' long-term decline.

Mehmed refused the offer of peace proffered, and proceeded with his siege plans by commissioning the construction of a large fortress that would be used to control all sea traffic along the Bosphorus, and would work together with the older Anadoluhisari (Anatolia Fortress) on the strait to prevent any possible maritime aid from reaching Constantinople during the final Ottoman siege of the city in 1453, particularly from Genoese colonies along the Black Sea, such as Caffa, Sinop and Amasra.

This tall, hilltop site on the strait's European banks not only made for easier control of the waterway, but also had the advantage of being situated directly across the Anadoluhisarı ("Anatolian Fortress") on the Anatolian (i.e. Asian) banks of the Bosphorus; an older Ottoman fortress built between 1393 and 1394 by Sultan Bayezid I. Historically, there had been a Roman fortification at the hilltop where Rumelihisari was to be built, which had later been used as a prison by the Byzantines and Genoese. Later on, a monastery had been built there.

Construction began on April 15, 1452. For good luck, ram's blood was mixed with the mortar for the first layer. Some have speculated the layout is a cabbalistic combination of the initials of Mehmed and the Prophet Muhammad. Each one of the three main towers was named after the royal vizier who supervised its respective construction; Sadrazam Çandarlı Halil Pasha, who built the large tower next to the gate; Zağanos Pasha, who built the south tower; and Sarıca Pasha, who built the north tower. The Sultan himself personally inspected the activities on the site.

Architecture

The Rumelihisarı fortification has one small tower, three main towers, and thirteen small watchtowers placed on the walls connecting the main towers. One watchtower is in the form of a quadrangular prism, six watchtowers are shaped as prisms with multiple corners, and six others are cylindrical.

Today, this tower is also known as Fatih ("Conqueror") Tower after Sultan Mehmed II's cognomen. The large tower at the waterfront in the middle of the fortress, Halil Pasha Tower, is a dodecagonal prism, and also has 9 stories. The main tower in the south, Zağanos Pasha Tower, has only 8 stories. The space within each tower was divided up with wooden floors, each equipped with a furnace. Conical wooden roofs covered with lead originally crowned the towers, although these no longer survive today.

The fortress had three main gates next to the main towers, one side gate and two secret gates for the arsenal and food cellars next to the southern tower. There were wooden houses for the soldiers and a small mosque, endowed by the Sultan at the time of construction. Only the minaret shaft remains of the original mosque, while the small masjid added in the mid-16th century has not survived. Water was supplied to the fortress from a large cistern underneath the mosque and distributed through three wall-fountains, of which only one remains. Two inscriptive plaques are found attached to the walls.

The fortress was initially called "Boğazkesen", literally meaning "Strait Cutter", referring to the Bosporus Strait. The name carries a secondary and more macabre meaning; as boğaz not only means strait but also "throat" in Turkish.

It was later renamed as Rumelihisarı, which means "Fortress on the Land of the Romans", i.e. Byzantine Europe, or the Balkan peninsula.

Usage in the past

A battalion of 400 Janissaries was stationed in the fortress, and large cannons were placed in the Halil Pasha Tower, the main tower on the waterfront. Having completed his fortresses, Mehmed proceeded to levy a toll on ships passing within reach of their cannon. A Venetian vessel ignoring signals to stop was sunk with a single shot and all the surviving sailors beheaded, except for the captain, who was impaled and mounted as a human scarecrow as a warning to further sailors on the strait. These cannons were later used until the second half of the 19th century to greet the sultan when he passed by sea.

After the fall of Constantinople, the fortress served as a customs checkpoint. Rumelihisarı, designated to control the passage of ships through the strait, eventually lost its strategic importance when a second pair of fortresses was built farther up the Bosphorus, where the strait meets the Black Sea. In the 17th century, it was used as a prison, primarily for foreign prisoners of war. Rumelihisarı was partly destroyed by an earthquake in 1509 but was repaired soon after. In 1746, a fire destroyed all the wooden parts in two of the main towers. The fortress was repaired by Sultan Selim III (1761–1807). However, a new residential neighborhood was formed inside the fortress after it was abandoned in the 19th century.

Modern history

In 1953, on the orders of President Celal Bayar, the inhabitants were relocated and extensive restoration work began on 16 May 1955, which lasted until 29 May 1958. Since 1960 Rumelihisarı has been a museum and an open-air theater for various concerts at festivals during the summer months.

The Fatih Sultan Mehmet Bridge, named after the Ottoman Sultan that commissioned Rumelihisarı and conquered the city, is located close to the fortress, to the north.

Rumelihisarı is open to public every day except Wednesdays from 9:00 to 16:30.

The fortress was depicted on various Turkish banknotes during 1939–1986.

Gallery

See also 
 Anadoluhisarı
 Yedikule Fortress
 Fall of Constantinople
 Ottoman architecture

Notes and references

 Silburn, P. A. B. (1912). The evolution of sea-power. London: Longmans, Green and Co.

External links

Archnet
Over 80 pictures of the fortress

Buildings and structures completed in 1452
Archaeological sites in the Marmara Region
Bosphorus
Buildings of Mehmed the Conqueror
Castles in Istanbul Province
Forts in Turkey
Landmarks in Turkey
Museums in Istanbul
Music venues in Istanbul
Ottoman fortifications
Sarıyer